Todd Wiseman Jr. (born July 15, 1987) is an American filmmaker and businessman. Wiseman is the co-founder of Hayden5, a New York-based production company. He has directed and produced music videos for several artists, such as Juelz Santana, Mariah Carey, Benny Benassi, and Jussie Smollett.

Life and career 
Wiseman was born in Hollywood, Florida, the son of Todd Alan Wiseman, a television executive and inventor, and Robin (née Rollins), a school teacher. In 2005, Wiseman enrolled in New York University's Tisch School of the Arts; he received his Bachelor of Arts in Film and Television in 2009.

Wiseman wrote, directed, and produced the sci-fi short film, The Exit Room starring Christopher Abbott, about a journalist who faces government execution during a future American Revolution. It was later nominated for Best Narrative Short at the Tribeca Film Festival in 2013.

In 2015, Wiseman helped produce the American drama film, Knucklehead, starring Gbenga Akinnagbe, Alfre Woodard, and Amari Cheatom. The film earned recognition at the American Black Film Festival.

Long Shot is a Netflix short documentary produced by Wiseman, which was released in 2017 and features Larry David. Long Shot earned several film nominations, including an Emmy Nomination for Best Short Film.

Lightningface, a short film starring Oscar Isaac, premiered in 2016 and was produced by Wiseman. The film debuted on Vimeo.

Hayden5 
Wiseman co-founded the production company Hayden5 with Milos Silber in 2009.

References

External links 
 
 Hayden5 Official Website

1987 births
Advertising directors
American film directors
American music video directors
Living people
New York University alumni
People from Hollywood, Florida
Television commercial directors